Self Entitled is the twelfth studio album by the American punk rock band NOFX. It was released on September 11, 2012 through Fat Wreck Chords.

Background and production
The album took more than a year to materialize. Vocalist and bassist Fat Mike revealed to The Daily Times in January 2011 that a follow-up to Coaster was in production, explaining "There are some really good songs on Coaster, but after having written 300 songs, I feel lucky I came up with them. That's why there are songs on there about Iron Maiden and Tegan and Sara. I'm reaching, man. Sometimes I grab stuff just to grab stuff, and I'm going in a lot of different directions." In December of that year, Fat Mike revealed to Phoenix New Times that he had begun work on a new NOFX album and a soundtrack to a "fetish film" called Rubber Bordello.

On February 14, 2012, Fat Mike revealed to Rolling Stone that NOFX was going to begin recording their twelfth studio album in April and added, "I've got 12 songs, but I don't have a name for it and only a few of the songs are finished. We're demo-ing it right now." On April 12, he posted a message on his Twitter page saying that the band was back in the studio with Bill Stevenson, who produced Wolves in Wolves' Clothing and Coaster. The recording process of Self Entitled was finished in two-and-a-half weeks  and it was eventually announced that NOFX would release the album internationally on September 10, 2012 and in the United States on the following day.

In an interview with Punknews.org in October 2012, Fat Mike said that they had recorded 18 songs, but only 12 made the album.

Singles
The album was preceded by two singles which were released on 7" and available digitally exclusively at Fat Wreck's site. The first, "My Stepdad's a Cop and My Stepmom's a Domme", was released on June 19, 2012. It was recorded prior to the album and featured the non-album title track and a different recording of "She Didn't Lose Her Baby". The second, "Ronnie and Mags", was released on August 14, 2012 and featured the album version of the title track and a demo version of "I Believe in Goddess".

Reception

Critical response to Self Entitled has been mixed. Fred Thomas of Allmusic gave it a middling review saying, "There's nothing outstanding here but fans of the band will have no complaints, and for newcomers it's as good a starting point as any, with arguably the same ratio of clever understated brilliance to uninspired mediocrity as any other phase of their discography." On the other hand, Jason Gardner of Absolute Punk gave the album a highly positive review stating that "NOFX take a crack at pressing matters both inwards and outwards, succeeding in not only making a seamless expression of both sides but cranking out some truly memorable jams to boot."

Track listing

Personnel
 Fat Mike – lead vocals, bass
 Eric Melvin – rhythm guitar, backing vocals
 El Hefe – lead guitar, vocals
 Erik Sandin – drums, percussion

Additional Musicians
 Spike Slawson – some backing vocals
 Mike Powell – keyboards

Production
 Bill Stevenson - producer
Engineers
Jamie McMann

References

External links

Self Entitled at YouTube (streamed copy where licensed)

2012 albums
NOFX albums
Fat Wreck Chords albums
Albums produced by Bill Stevenson (musician)